Dhaka-14 is a constituency represented in the Jatiya Sangsad (National Parliament) of Bangladesh since 2014 by Aslamul Haque of the Awami League.

Boundaries 
The constituency encompasses Savar Upazila and 07/08, 09, 10, 11 and 12 of Dhaka North City Corporation.

History 
The constituency was created for the first general elections in 2008.

Members of Parliament

Elections

References

External links
 

Parliamentary constituencies in Bangladesh
Dhaka District